Marshall Greenspan from Northrop Grumman Electronic Systems, Fairfield, CT was named Fellow of the Institute of Electrical and Electronics Engineers (IEEE) in 2013 for contributions to design and development multi-channel radars.

References

Fellow Members of the IEEE
Living people
Year of birth missing (living people)
Place of birth missing (living people)
Northrop Grumman people
American electrical engineers